Stormé DeLarverie (December 24, 1920 – May 24, 2014) was an American woman known as the butch lesbian whose scuffle with police was, according to Stormé and many eyewitnesses, the spark that ignited the Stonewall uprising, spurring the crowd to action. She was born in New Orleans, to an African American mother and a white father. She is remembered as a gay civil rights icon and entertainer, who performed and hosted at the Apollo Theater and Radio City Music Hall. She worked for much of her life as an MC, singer, bouncer, bodyguard, and volunteer street patrol worker, the "guardian of lesbians in the Village." She is known as "the Rosa Parks of the gay community."

Before Stonewall 
DeLarverie's father was white and wealthy. Her mother was African American and worked as a servant for his family. According to DeLarverie, she was never given a birth certificate and was not certain of her actual date of birth. She celebrated her birthday on December 24, Christmas Eve.

Her father paid for her education, and she was largely raised by her grandfather. As a biracial child, DeLarverie faced bullying and harassment from the other children. "The white kids were beating me up; the Black kids were. Everybody was jumping on me. ... For being a negro with a white face." She rode jumping horses with the Ringling Brothers Circus when she was a teenager. She stopped riding horses after being injured in a fall. She realized she was lesbian near the age of eighteen. 

Biracial and androgynous, she could pass for white or Black, male or female. She was picked up twice on the streets by police who mistook her for a drag queen.

Her partner, a dancer named Diana, lived with her for about 25 years until dying in the 1970s. According to friend Lisa Cannistraci, DeLarverie carried a photograph of Diana with her at all times.

Stonewall uprising 

Fifty-two years later, the events of June 28, 1969, have been called "the Stonewall riots." However, DeLarverie was very clear that "riot" is a misleading description:

At the Stonewall rebellion, a scuffle broke out when a woman in handcuffs, who may have been Stormé, was roughly escorted from the door of the bar to the waiting police wagon. She was brought through the crowd by police several times, as she escaped repeatedly. She fought with at least four of the police, swearing and shouting, for about ten minutes. Described by a witness as "a typical New York City butch" and "a dyke-stone butch," she had been hit on the head by an officer with a baton for, as one witness stated, announcing that her handcuffs were too tight. She was bleeding from a head wound as she fought back. Bystanders recalled that the woman, whose identity remains uncertain (Stormé has been identified by some, including herself, as the woman), sparked the crowd to fight when she looked at bystanders and shouted, "Why don't you guys do something?" After an officer picked her up and heaved her into the back of the wagon, the crowd became a mob and went "berserk": "It was at that moment that the scene became explosive." Some have referred to that woman as "the gay community's Rosa Parks".

"'Nobody knows who threw the first punch, but it's rumored that she did, and she said she did,' said Lisa Cannistraci, a friend of DeLarverie and owner of the Village lesbian bar Henrietta Hudson. 'She told me she did.'"

Whether or not DeLarverie was the woman who fought her way out of the police wagon, all accounts agree that she was one of several butch lesbians who fought back against the police during the uprising.

The Jewel Box Revue
From 1955 to 1969 DeLarverie toured the Black theater circuit as the MC (and only drag king) of the Jewel Box Revue, North America's first racially integrated drag revue. The revue regularly played the Apollo Theater in Harlem, as well as to mixed-race audiences, something that was still rare during the era of Racial segregation in the United States. She performed as a baritone.

During shows audience members would try to guess who the "one girl" was, among the revue performers, and at the end Stormé would reveal herself as a woman during a musical number called, "A Surprise with a Song," often wearing tailored suits and sometimes a moustache that made her "unidentifiable" to audience members. As a singer, she drew inspiration from Dinah Washington and Billie Holiday (both of whom she knew in person). During this era when there were very few drag kings performing, her unique drag style and subversive performances became celebrated, influential, and are now known to have set a historic precedent.

In 1987 Michelle Parkerson released the first cut of the movie, Stormé: The Lady of the Jewel Box, about DeLarverie and her time with the revue.

Influence on fashion
With her theatrical experience in costuming, performance and makeup, biracial DeLarverie could pass as either a man or a woman, Black or white. Offstage, she cut a striking, handsome, androgynous presence, and inspired other lesbians to adopt what had formerly been considered "men's" clothing as street wear. She was photographed by renowned artist Diane Arbus, as well as other friends and lovers in the arts community, in three piece suits and "men's" hats. She is now considered to have been an influence on gender-nonconforming women's fashion decades before unisex styles became accepted.

Life after Stonewall 
DeLarverie's role in the Gay liberation movement lasted long after the uprisings of 1969.

In the 1980s and 1990s she worked as a bouncer for several lesbian bars in New York City, including Elaine Romagnoli's Cubby Hole. She was a member of the Stonewall Veterans' Association, 
holding the offices of Chief of Security, Ambassador and, in 1998 to 2000, Vice President. She was a regular at the gay pride parade. For decades DeLarverie served the community as a volunteer street patrol worker, the "guardian of lesbians in the Village."

In addition to her work for the LGBT community, she also organized and performed at benefits for battered women and children. When asked about why she chose to do this work, she replied, "Somebody has to care. People say, 'Why do you still do that?' I said, 'It's very simple. If people didn't care about me when I was growing up, with my mother being black, raised in the south.' I said, 'I wouldn't be here.'"

For several decades, DeLarverie lived at New York City's famous Hotel Chelsea, where she "thrived on the atmosphere created by the many writers, musicians, artists, and actors." Cannistraci says that DeLarverie continued working as a bouncer until age 85.

In June 2019, DeLarverie was one of the inaugural fifty American "pioneers, trailblazers, and heroes" inducted on the National LGBTQ Wall of Honor within the Stonewall National Monument (SNM) in New York City's Stonewall Inn. The SNM is the first U.S. national monument dedicated to LGBTQ rights and history, and the wall's unveiling was timed to take place during the 50th anniversary of the Stonewall riots.

Illness and death 
DeLarverie suffered from dementia in her later years. From 2010 to 2014, she lived in a nursing home in Brooklyn. Though she seemingly did not recognize she was in a nursing home, her memories of her childhood and the Stonewall Uprisings remained strong.

On June 7, 2012, Brooklyn Pride, Inc. honored Stormé DeLarverie at the Brooklyn Society for Ethical Culture. Michelle Parkerson's film, Stormé: The Lady of the Jewel Box, was screened. On April 24, 2014, DeLarverie was honored alongside Edith Windsor by the Brooklyn Community Pride Center, "for her fearlessness and bravery" and was also presented with a proclamation from New York City Public Advocate, Letitia James.

She died in her sleep on May 24, 2014, in Brooklyn. No immediate family members were alive at her time of death. Lisa Cannistraci, who became one of DeLarverie's legal guardians, stated that the cause of death was a heart attack. She remembers DeLarverie as "a very serious woman when it came to protecting people she loved." A funeral was held May 29, 2014, at the Greenwich Village Funeral Home.

Notes

See also
 LGBT culture in New York City
 List of LGBT people from New York City

References

Sources
 Carter, David (2004). Stonewall: The Riots that Sparked the Gay Revolution, St. Martin's Press. 
 Duberman, Martin (1993). Stonewall, Penguin Books.

External links
A Stormé Life : An interview with Stormé from 2001
 
 
 Stonewall Vets: Stormé DeLarvarie
 Archive of DeLarvarie's personal papers, photos and memorabilia at the New York Public Library Schomburg Center for Research in Black Culture, Manuscripts, Archives and Rare Books Division
NPR CODE SWITCH - They Don't Say Our Names Enough: Looking back at the life of Storme DeLarverie — a Black butch woman who didn't pull any punches when it came to protecting her community from violence

1920 births
2014 deaths
20th-century African-American women singers
American drag kings
Lesbian musicians
LGBT African Americans
LGBT people from Louisiana
LGBT people from New York (state)
Entertainers from New York City
Security guards
Ringling Bros. and Barnum & Bailey Circus people
People from New Orleans
African-American history in New York City
American baritones
Singers from Louisiana
American LGBT rights activists
African-American activists
Activists from New York City
Activists from Louisiana
History of civil rights in the United States
Masters of ceremonies
21st-century African-American people
21st-century African-American women